Mike Ruiz is a Canadian photographer, director, television personality, former model, spokesperson, creative director, and actor.

Early life
Ruiz, who is of French Canadian and Spanish Filipino ancestry, was born in Montreal in 1964, but raised in Repentigny, Quebec, Canada. He was one of three sons born to Francoise and Anthony Ruiz. He moved to the United States at age 20 to pursue a career in the entertainment industry. After modeling for a decade he moved to Los Angeles to study acting. In 1997, Ruiz appeared in the independent film Latin Boys Go to Hell. In 2002 he moved from Los Angeles into an old friends (Peel & Tracy James) SOHO apartment in New York City to pursue his career in photography. Mike was then able to establish a new agent in NYC which propelled his career forward as a photographer.

Career

Photography
At the age of 28 Ruiz began in the field of photography. "I found a camera under my Christmas tree and within minutes, I was obsessed. I began shooting everything in sight. I taught myself the intricate mechanics of the camera but it was several years before I realized that I could actually make a living with my work‚" Ruiz was quoted as saying. Presently based in New Jersey, Ruiz is known for celebrity and fashion photography.

His work has appeared in numerous American and international magazines such as Vanity Fair, Flaunt, Condé Nast Traveler, Interview, Paper, Citizen K, Dazed and Confused, Arena, Italian Elle, Spanish and Brazilian Vogue and was a contributor to Dolce & Gabbana's Hollywood book and Iman's The Beauty of Color beauty book. He photographed the album cover for Kelly Clarkson's All I Ever Wanted.

Designer
Menswear designer J. Cheikh collaborated with Ruiz to design a capsule collection for the Spring/Summer 2012 menswear collection in hopes of capitalizing on his fashion expertise and personal style. The collection was called "Mike Ruiz for J. Cheikh".

Directing
In addition to his advertising and celebrity clients, Ruiz has branched out as a director doing music video for artists such as Vanessa Williams, Kelly Rowland, Jody Watley, Traci Lords, Kristine W and Shontelle. He also made his feature film directorial debut in 2007 with Starrbooty, starring RuPaul.

Television
Ruiz has appeared on several reality shows, including Kathy Griffin: My Life on the D-List, America's Next Top Model, and RuPaul's Drag Race, as a celebrity photographer and guest judge. He also rounded out the panel of expert judges on the third season of Canada's Next Top Model.

Ruiz was a member of the cast of Logo network's reality series, The A-List: New York, for its first two seasons. He left the show in 2011.

Personal life 
Ruiz moved to New Jersey in 2013 with his partner Martin Berusch, who died in 2016. Ruiz has been married to Wayne Schatz since May 2019.

References

Further reading
 Willis, Davis (November 15, 2011) Mike Ruiz: Master of Hopefulness
 dodho magazine

External links
 
 

Living people
American music video directors
Anglophone Quebec people
Artists from Montreal
Canadian male film actors
Canadian music video directors
Fashion photographers
Film directors from Montreal
Canadian gay actors
Canadian LGBT artists
Male actors from Montreal
People from Repentigny, Quebec
Participants in American reality television series
Year of birth missing (living people)